The monkey tree phenomenon was a social phenomenon in Singapore, which began in September 2007. It arose from the discovery of a callus on a tree in Hong Kah, which appears monkey-like.  Some believe the image to be of divine origin, while others have attributed the phenomenon to the effects of pareidolia, whereby random stimuli are perceived as meaningful. The callus has initiated a minor social mania, drawing large crowds to look or pray at the tree.

History

Beginnings
The phenomenon started on 12 September 2007 when an unknown person put up a sign in Chinese on a tree on Jurong West Street 42. The sign read that a monkey had come to the tree three years ago to look for his father, the Monkey God. It added that a recent car accident had split the old bark of the tree open, releasing the Monkey God. One resident purported that the monkey image appeared around 3 September 2007.

The appearance of the sign and the monkey outline on the tree trunk were reported in the local English and Chinese-language newspapers such as The New Paper, The Straits Times and Lianhe Zaobao. Reports also quoted residents claiming how three car accidents had earlier happened at the spot, but none had been fatal, purportedly due to the tree's "magical" properties.

Since news broke on 13 September 2007, hundreds of people from all over Singapore have flocked to the usually quiet HDB neighbourhood to pay homage to the tree. By the afternoon of 13 September, the crowd visiting the tree had swelled to more than 30, with offerings occupying the grass patch surrounding the tree.

Monkey outline
The tree with the monkey outline is a species of the African Mahogany. It is a common tree planted by the National Parks Board (NParks) to provide shade, particularly in parks and along major roads and expressways. It is a hardy tree that grows well under most soil conditions.

On the trunk of the tree in question is an outline of two monkeys – one larger than the other – with limbs, faces and bodies. They were formed on a surface that is smoother and of a slightly lighter colour than the rest of the trunk. Some people claimed to see three monkeys.

NParks gave a plausible explanation for how the monkey outline could have been formed: The tree was involved in several minor accidents over the years. The uneven bark surface at the base of the tree trunk was the result of callusing, a natural reaction in which the tree grows new bark over injured areas.

The department of biological sciences at the National University of Singapore explained that patterns formed by callusing are random and depend on the damage caused by the accidents. It added that the monkey outline on the smoother bark may disappear with time as the new tissue layers form under it and push this layer out. Subsequently, the smooth surface would get darker and rougher, like the rest of the tree bark.

Public mania
Devotees to the tree believed that the images are either a manifestation of Sun Wukong, a deity from Chinese mythology, or Hanuman, the monkey deity in the Hindu pantheon, and that praying to them would bring them luck.

The crowd has been leaving bunches of bananas, packets of peanuts, oranges and chrysanthemum flowers, burning joss sticks, and praying for lucky 4-D numbers at the tree. People also started burning incense paper, prompting a resident to place a zinc barrel beside the tree so that the ashes could be scooped into the barrel. Some residents even won a bet on the 4-D draw held on 12 September. The winning number "4309" was obtained by combining the HDB block number near the tree (430) and the order of the Monkey in the Chinese zodiac (ninth).

There were volunteers who helped to distribute the bananas and peanuts to people who drop by. Some of them have also put up signs telling people not to leave red packets filled with money beneath the tree. A visitor had left a tin can containing tiny rolls of paper at the tree.

Thousands of people have since visited the tree, and the crowd grew to over 200 at one point on the afternoon of 14 September. The crowd consisted of both men and women, mostly Chinese and Indians of all ages. The people wanted a peek of the monkey images, while many took pictures of the tree with their mobile phones. Images of the monkey tree were even sold at S$3 or S$10 a photograph near the tree.

The crowds were so large that residents started complaining of the noise, littering and traffic jams caused by vehicles parked illegally along the narrow road. This prompted the police to patrol the area.

Two nearby trees also started garnering offerings from 14 September – one for a supposed outline of Guan Yin, the Goddess of Mercy, on its trunk, and another whose bark resembles the Hindu elephant god Ganesha.

Sociological explanations
Many experts interviewed by The Straits Times thought that the phenomenon could be a case of "believing is seeing".

A sociologist from the National University of Singapore explained that "those who believe in divine objects are mostly those who follow a simple faith which is founded in tangible evidences of the sacred". He referred to the believers who, in May 2006, flocked to the mountains of Mexico's southern Chiapas state where a rock with an image that resembles Jesus Christ was discovered.

Another sociologist pointed out that "these objects are called fetishes or 'objects that are imbued with deep symbolic significance to become sacred objects that embody gods and spirits'." In the monkey tree's case, it was because of a "natural transformation of its material appearance that reminds people of an important legend", and "this form of worship is actually basic to human religious behaviour".

See also
Perceptions of religious imagery in natural phenomena

Notes

References
 archived at

Further reading

External links
Goh, Charles (16 September 2007). Solved – The Case of the Singapore Monkey Tree.
Image of tree at block 431

Jurong West
Perceptions of religious imagery in natural phenomena
Singaporean culture